Headline Daily was launched on 12 July 2005, by Sing Tao Newspaper Group Limited and became the second free Chinese-language newspaper published officially in Hong Kong (Metro Daily being the first). The paper is only distributed on weekdays and is aimed at the working class.  The estimated average daily circulation of the paper is around 900,000-1,000,000. The paper provides local and international news as well as articles on business news, entertainment, lifestyle and sports.

Reasons for the launch of the newspaper 

The newspaper was launched as the Chairman of Sing Tao News Corporation, Charles Ho Tsu Kwok, felt there was room for the further development of free newspapers in Hong Kong in terms of content, distribution network and advertising formats.

The pace of life in Hong Kong is so fast and people are so busy that Headline Daily was established to meet the people's needs by providing them with first-hand information on the hottest daily topics in a manner as concise and lively as possible, while attempting to portray a "positive" and "lively" image to readers.

In terms of market competition, the Headline Daily was also launched in a bid to gain a greater market share of the territory's advertising market for Sing Tao News Corporation and to explore a new source of income for the corporation.

Distribution 
Daily issues are distributed during morning peak hours from Monday to Friday, except on public holidays. It is distributed in more than 600 different places, among which there are now three fixed distribution media: McDonald's restaurants, KCR stations (except Tsim Sha Tsui East, Tai Wai, Racecourse and Sheung Shui Stations), and nearly 500 residential estates. Moreover, the papers are distributed at more than 100 fixed or non-fixed spots, including commercial buildings, bus/mini-bus stops and shopping malls all around Hong Kong. Readers may simply get a free issue from the eye-catching red shelves at most locations or from the staff at certain locations.

Readership 
The newspaper targets the working population, who are usually too busy to read a large number of pages nor to read every piece of news in detail. However, these people are likely to grasp every chance to read newspapers for a short period when travelling or having breakfast.

In August 2005, a market research survey was conducted by Synovate, comparing the readership of 3 free newspapers in Hong Kong. The result shows that in the first three weeks of August, Metropolis Daily, Headline Daily and am730 respectively achieved 16%, 18% and 8% of the market shares. Headline Daily gains the leading readership of 893,000, compared with Metropolis Daily's 820,000 and am730's 401,000.

Contents 

"Headline Daily" shares news sources with the Sing Tao Daily.
The paper aims to present the most important news of the day in a concise way so as to provide readers with up-to-date, yet comprehensive, news and information on different areas in a short read. It usually has around 24 to 30 pages and has a layout similar to the following formats:

Headlines (i.e. coverpage; with daily information such as Marksix Result, Activities of the Day, Lunar Calendar and Weather Forecast)
Local News (with critics)
China News
International news
Financial news (i.e. news on Real Estate, Business and stock market)
Sports news
Lifestyle (different topics for each day: Technology(Monday), Fashion(Tuesday), Shopping(Wednesday), Amusement(Thursday) and Food(Friday))
Entertainment (local and international entertainment news, along with Television Programme Schedule)
The remaining pages are used for advertisements.

In a comment by Sing Tao chief executive Lo Wing-hung, he claimed that the average number of pages could be increased to 40 pages if its readership increases significantly over time. However, so far, more than three months after the first publication, the newspaper only consists of around 24 pages on the average.

Marketing strategies
Headline Daily implements marketing strategies including:

 "lucky draws" & "voting games"
 "apple-shaped pellet": a massage device, which working class readers can use to relax themselves and relieve their stress, was once offered to readers along with their newspaper
 "happy lucky reader": one reader is randomly chosen in public areas (e.g. in a MTR train) and awarded HK$500 on a daily basis

Moreover, to extend the market to overseas, a softcopy version Headline Daily is made accessible on line.

Public relations 
A 2021 Reuters Institute poll found that Headline Daily had a 53% trust rating from Hong Kong respondents, which was the fifth highest percentage out of 15 local media outlets surveyed.

Headline Daily invites readers to submit news articles for publication in return for rewards as a sign of its co-operation with the public. According to the official website, readers can become reporters for Headline Daily by handing in any information.  While this information should be deemed to be news-worthy, other guidelines are provided on what type of news should be submitted. Particularly, the paper states that it has no interest in collecting any commentaries from the public. Meanwhile, the usage of any material submitted is solely dependent on the newspaper's discretion.  The paper rewards any readers whose materials are published or utilised with a one-time sum of $100, regardless of how many times the paper uses these pieces of news.

See also
 Sing Tao News Corporation Limited
 Sing Tao Daily
 Free daily newspapers
 Newspapers of Hong Kong
 Media in Hong Kong

References

Articles
Distribution the key for latest free daily paper – The Standard, Mark Lee.
Newspaper war won't affect us, says HKET- The Standard, Wong Ka-chun.
Hong Kong: Ming Pao shrugs off impact of free dailies – AsiaMedia, Frederick Yeung.
Tabloid Newspaper War in Hong Kong – Asia Review, James Borton.
Hong Kong's Newspaper Wars – Tabloid Titans Battle For First Place – JINN, Coral Hui.

External links
  

Chinese-language newspapers published in Hong Kong
Free daily newspapers
Publications established in 2005
Sing Tao News Corporation